Marcinów  is a village in the administrative district of Gmina Kłodzko, within Kłodzko County, Lower Silesian Voivodeship, in south-western Poland. Prior to 1945 it was in Germany.

In 2005 the village had a population of 126.

External links
About Marcinów on the website of Gmina Kłodzko

Villages in Kłodzko County